In Greek mythology, Autochthe (Ancient Greek: Αὐτόχθη, Aὐtókhthē) was a Mycenaean princess.

Family 
Autochthe was one of the two daughters of Perseus and Andromeda. Her sister was Gorgophone while her brothers were Perses, Alcaeus, Heleus, Mestor, Sthenelus, Electryon and Cynurus.

Mythology 
Autochthoe married Aegeus and had by him several daughters, but no sons. Some traditions held that she was the only spouse of Aegeus, yet in other accounts, Aegeus was said to have married and divorced several times because none of his wives bore him male heirs, which put his kingdom at risk of being usurped.  This marriage with Autochthe might have been political as well, since marriage with one of the Perseids would mean alliance between Argos and Athens.

Notes

Princesses in Greek mythology
Perseid dynasty

Reference 

 Apollodorus, The Library with an English Translation by Sir James George Frazer, F.B.A., F.R.S. in 2 Volumes, Cambridge, MA, Harvard University Press; London, William Heinemann Ltd. 1921. ISBN 0-674-99135-4. Online version at the Perseus Digital Library. Greek text available from the same website.
Tzetzes, John, Book of Histories, Book V-VI translated by Konstantinos Ramiotis from the original Greek of T. Kiessling's edition of 1826. Online version at theio.com.